Salvatore Fisichella (born 25 August 1951), commonly known as Rino Fisichella, is an Italian prelate of the Roman Catholic Church with the rank of archbishop. He is the current Pro-prefect for the Section of New Evangelization of the Dicastery for Evangelization. Formerly, he was the president of the Pontifical Council for the Promotion of the New Evangelization from 2010-2022, and the Pontifical Academy for Life from 2008-2010.

Fisichella is related to the so named Italian noble family, forming part of the Sicilian nobility, and his ecclesiastical coat of arms is inspired by the family arms.

Early life and ordination
Born in Codogno in the province of Lodi, to parents from Sicily, and baptized with the name Salvatore, Fisichella studied classics at St. Francis College in Lodi. He received a degree in theology from the Pontifical Gregorian University and was ordained a priest for the diocese of Rome on 13 March 1976 by Ugo Poletti, Papal Vicar of Rome.

After ordination, he held a number of positions including Professor of Fundamental Theology at the Pontifical Gregorian University and the Pontifical Lateran University, consultor of the Congregation for the Doctrine of the Faith, member of the Central Committee of the Great Jubilee Year 2000 and vice president of the Historical-Theological Commission of the same committee.

He was appointed a Chaplain of His Holiness in 1994. He has served as a chaplain to the Italian parliament. He is a specialist in the theology of Hans Urs von Balthasar, on whom he did extensive research in 1980.

Bishop
He was appointed an Auxiliary Bishop of Rome with the titular see of Vicohabentia on 3 July 1998 and was consecrated a bishop by Cardinal Camillo Ruini on 12 September 1998.

He was president of the diocesan commission on ecumenism and interfaith relations. He worked in the Congregation for the Doctrine of the Faith and in the Congregation for the Causes of Saints. He was said to have collaborated in the publication of Fides et Ratio in 1998.

He was named rector of the Lateran University on 18 January 2002. On 8 September 2002, he was named a member of the Congregation for the Doctrine of the Faith.

During the Muhammad caricature controversy of 2005, Fisichella said that the freedom of the press was not absolute and not meant to be used against others. He was a friend of Oriana Fallaci. In 2005, he celebrated the 100th anniversary of the catechism of Saint Pius X.

When asked in 2005 if he would give Communion to Italian politicians Romano Prodi and Pier Ferdinando Casini, Fisichella responded that he "did not see a reason" for refusing Communion to Prodi, whereas Casini "knows well the rules of the Church" and does not present himself for Communion.

Pontifical Academy of Life
On 17 June 2008, he was given the title of archbishop and named president of the Pontifical Academy for Life.

In December 2008, he wrote to the members of Luxembourg's legislature, which was considering legislation to legalize euthanasia and assisted suicide, saying a Catholic legislator has "the clear obligation to oppose any legislation that is an attack on human life" and that Catholic voters could not vote in good conscience for a legislator who voted for such a law. Prime Minister Jean-Claude Juncker criticized him for interfering.

On 24 January 2009, he urged US President Barack Obama to listen to all voices in America without "the arrogance of those who, being in power, believe they can decide of life and death." When Obama ended the ban on U.S. funding of organizations that discuss and perform abortion in the developing world, he said: "Among the many good things that he could have done, Barack Obama instead has chosen the worst. If this is one of the first acts of President Obama, with all due respect, it seems to me that the path toward disappointment has been very short."

In a case that attracted international attention in 2009, when Brazilian Archbishop Jose Cardoso Sobrinho said that an abortion performed on a nine-year-old girl pregnant with twins, reportedly fathered by her stepfather, had resulted in excommunication for the mother who arranged for the abortion and the doctors who carried it out, Fisichella defended the doctors in a statement addressed to the girl: "There are others who deserve excommunication and our forgiveness, not those who permitted you to live and who will help you to regain hope and faith." He wrote: "Her life was in serious danger because of the pregnancy in progress. How to act in these cases? An arduous decision for the physician and for the moral law itself. The conscience of the physician finds itself alone when forced to decide the best thing to do. A choice like that of having to save a life, knowing that one puts a second at serious risk, never comes easily." L'Osservatore Romano published Fisichella's essay critical of Sobrinho on its front page. Several members of the academy wrote a letter protesting Fisichella's intervention in the case. In July, L'Osservatore Romano published a document issued by the Congregation for the Doctrine of the Faith called "Clarification on procured abortion", which declared that church teaching on abortion had not changed and will not change.

Pontifical Council for the Promotion of the New Evangelisation
On 30 June 2010, Fisichella was appointed as the first president of the planned Pontifical Council for the Promotion of the New Evangelisation. He was replaced as president of the Pontifical Academy for Life by Monsignor Ignacio Carrasco de Paula, who had served as chancellor of the academy. At the same time, Archbishop Fisichella resigned his position as rector of the Pontifical Lateran University, and Enrico dal Covolo, S.D.B., was appointed as his successor.

Shortly after his appointment, Archbishop Fisichella called for an investigation into who covered up for the Legion of Christ's disgraced founder, Marciel Maciel ("those who took his appointments, those who kept his agenda, those who drove him around"). Fisichella suggested that the Vatican look inside the legion. "We must be able to verify how well-covered up it was inside his congregation, not outside it".

Fisichella's task is to reawaken the faith in traditionally Christian parts of the world, particularly Europe and North America. The idea is that, while the countries within Christendom today were first "evangelised", or converted to Christianity, many centuries ago, today it stands in need of a "new evangelisation" because of a decline of faith in the West. His first, declared project was a celebration in 2012 of the 20th anniversary of the publication of the Catechism of the Catholic Church.

During the press conference on the release in October 2010 of the motu proprio authorizing the setting up of the new council, the members of which were appointed in January 2011, Archbishop Fisichella stated that his new office did not yet have an internet connection, or even a computer: "Right now, I'm just hoping to get a computer in my office so I can get on the internet myself."

In February 2011, following public controversies with respect to Bishop Richard Williamson's denial of the Holocaust and the Regensburg lecture's impact on Christian-Muslim relations, Fisichella dismissed as premature the idea of assessing the papacy of Pope Benedict XVI. He said: "We're still at the beginning of a pontificate, and in my opinion it's always difficult to make judgments or offer a far-ranging analysis at the beginning. ...A sense of history should make us prudent and cautious from this point of view."

In August 2011, Fischella unveiled the Mission Metropolis which was to start in Lent 2012. The plan was to revive Christianity in Europe. The cities that would take part were: Barcelona, Budapest, Brussels, Dublin, Cologne, Lisbon, Liverpool, Paris, Turin, Warsaw and Vienna. The plan emphasized ordinary pastoral care activities, particularly in the field of formation for the priesthood, and the implementation of activities such as reading of the Gospel and the Confessions of St Augustine.

On 10 December 2011, he was appointed to a five-year renewable term as a member of the Pontifical Council for Culture. On 29 December 2011, he was appointed to a similar term as a member of the Pontifical Council for Social Communications. On 7 March 2012, he was named a member of the Pontifical Committee for International Eucharistic Congresses.

In March 2012, when former British Prime Minister Tony Blair, a Catholic since 2007, expressed support for same sex marriage, Fisichella said: "If the stories in the press about Blair's thinking are true, I think he should examine his conscience carefully".

In May 2017, he said that Pope Benedict XVI should not use the title "Pope emeritus", "which theologically creates more problems rather than solving them". He praised Benedict XVI's decision to retire, but said he hoped another title could be found.

Dicastery for Evangelization 
When the Apostolic Constitution Praedicate evangelium was enforced on 5 June 2022, Archbishop Fisichella assumed the position of the Pro-prefect for the Section of New Evangelization of the Dicastery for Evangelization. The Dicastery for Evangelization is a merger of the Congregation for the Evangelization of Peoples and the Pontifical Council for Promoting the New Evangelization, for which the Archbishop is the president.

See also

Fisichella family
Fisichella (surname)
Diocese of Rome
Roman Curia
The Roman Catholic Church and Abortion

References

1951 births
Living people
People of Sicilian descent
People from Codogno
21st-century Italian Roman Catholic titular archbishops
Pontifical Academy for Life
Almo Collegio Capranica alumni
Pontifical Gregorian University alumni
Members of the Pontifical Council for the Promotion of the New Evangelisation
Members of the Pontifical Council for Culture
Members of the Pontifical Council for Social Communications
Rino